Goniocidaris is a genus of sea urchins (Echinoidea) in the family Cidaridae and typical of the subfamily Goniocidarinae.  Extant species are mostly found in Indo-Pacific seas, often living at depth.

Species 

subgenus Aspidocidaris Mortensen, 1928
 Goniocidaris alba Mortensen, 1928
 Goniocidaris australiae Mortensen, 1928
 Goniocidaris clypeata Döderlein, 1885
 Goniocidaris crassa Mortensen, 1928
 Goniocidaris fimbriata (De Meijere, 1904)
 Goniocidaris parasol Fell, 1958
 Goniocidaris sibogae Mortensen, 1928
subgenus Cyrtocidaris Mortensen, 1927
 Goniocidaris tenuispina Mortensen, 1927
subgenus Discocidaris Döderlein, 1885
 Goniocidaris mikado (Döderlein, 1885)
 Goniocidaris peltata Mortensen, 1927
subgenus Goniocidaris
 Goniocidaris balinensis Mortensen, 1932
 Goniocidaris indica Mortensen, 1939
 Goniocidaris tubaria (Lamarck, 1816) - type species
 Goniocidaris umbraculum Hutton, 1878
subgenus Petalocidaris Mortensen, 1903
 Goniocidaris biserialis (Döderlein, 1885)
 Goniocidaris florigera A. Agassiz, 1879
 Goniocidaris spinosa Mortensen, 1928
not placed in any subgenus
 Goniocidaris corona Baker, 1968
 Goniocidaris habanensis Sánchez Roig, 1949 †
 Goniocidaris hebe Fell, 1954 †
 Goniocidaris holguinensis Sánchez Roig, 1949 †
 Goniocidaris magi Pawson, 1964
 Goniocidaris mortenseni Chapman & Cudmore, 1934 †
 Goniocidaris murrayensis Chapman & Cudmore, 1934 †
 Goniocidaris praecipua Philip, 1964 †
 Goniocidaris pusilla Fell, 1954 †

References

External links
 
 

Cidaridae
Cidaroida genera